Freedom 106.5 (106.5 FM) is a radio station Broadcasting from Trinidad and Tobago owned and operated by The TBC Radio Network. The station rebranded from Aakash Vani 106.5FM to Freedom 106.5 in April 2022 with content from Aakash Vani moving to an online format.

Radio stations in Trinidad and Tobago
Radio stations established in 2007